Antria Kirkini (born 8 May 1995) is a Cypriot footballer who plays as a forward for First Division club Lakatamia FC and the Cyprus women's national team.

International career
Kirkini capped for Cyprus at senior level during two friendly matches in early 2019.

References

1995 births
Living people
Cypriot women's footballers
Cyprus women's international footballers
Women's association football forwards